A perfect month or a rectangular month designates a month whose number of days is divisible by the number of days in a week and whose first day corresponds to the first day of the week. This causes arrangement of days of the month to resemble a rectangle. In the Gregorian calendar, this arrangement can only occur for the month of February.

Constraints 
To satisfy such an arrangement in the Gregorian calendar, the number of days in the month must be divisible by seven. Only the month of February of a common year can meet this constraint as the month has 28 days, a multiple of 7.

In order for a February to be a perfect month, the month must start on a Monday. This means that the year must start on a Friday.

Occurrence 
In the Gregorian calendar, the phenomenon occurs every 6 years or 11 years following a 6-11-11 sequence until the end of the 21st century. The last perfect month was in 2021. Due to calculation rules, the years 1800 and 1900 are not leap years, causing a shift in the sequence with a spacing of 12 years between 1790 and 1802 and between 1897 and 1909 respectively; however 2094, 2100 and 2106 will all feature perfect months with spacings of 6 years.

Attributes 
The calendar arrangement brings together notions of harmony and organization.

References

See also

Related articles 
 Perfect months: February 1909, February 1915, February 1926, February 1937, February 1943, February 1954, February 1965, February 1971,  February 1982, February 1993, February 1999, February 2010, February 2021
 Palindrome § Dates
 Perfectionism (psychology)
 Perfectionism (philosophy)

Calendars
February